Lists of space organizations include:

 List of government space agencies
 List of non-profit space agencies
 List of private spaceflight companies
 List of space forces, units, and formations

Space organizations